The 1997 Jeux de la Francophonie, also known as IIIes Jeux de la Francophonie, (French for Francophone Games) were held in Antananarivo, Madagascar from August 27 to September 6, 1997.

Events

Sports

Cultural

Medals and participation

Total

The following participation nations didn't win any medal.

External links
 Medal winners 1997 at jeux.francophonie.org 
 Medal tables at jeux.francophonie.org 
 Videoclip about the Games with dates at   www.canal-insep.fr

 
J
Sport in Madagascar
Jeux de la Francophonie
Olympics
Multi-sport events in Madagascar